Wilson Kenidy Correia Silva (born 2 February 1993), known as Wilson Kenidy, is an Angolan footballer who plays as a left winger for Portuguese club U.D. Oliveirense.

External links

1993 births
Living people
Footballers from Luanda
Angolan footballers
Association football wingers
Segunda Divisão players
Casa Pia A.C. players
C.F. Os Belenenses players
Cypriot First Division players
Louletano D.C. players
Doxa Katokopias FC players
Liga Portugal 2 players
Campeonato de Portugal (league) players
Angolan expatriate footballers
Expatriate footballers in Cyprus
Expatriate footballers in Portugal
Angolan expatriate sportspeople in Portugal